Jaintia Rajbari is a royal residence located in Jaintiapur, Sylhet, Bangladesh. It was the residence of the rulers of the Jaintia Kingdom.

See also
Khasi people
Pnar people

References

Architecture in Bangladesh
Architectural history
Tourist attractions in Bangladesh
Sylhet District